The 2008 Slamdance Film Festival took place in Park City, Utah from January 17 to January 25, 2008. It was the 14th iteration of the Slamdance Film Festival, an alternative to the more mainstream Sundance Film Festival.

The Festival received over 3,500 submissions from 25 countries for less than 100 slots.

Awards
The 2008 Slamdance Film Festival recognized the following films at its awards ceremony. The Grand Jury Narrative Feature and Documentary Feature Award winners will be screened at the IFC Center in New York City in February 2008. Only first-time filmmakers working with production budgets of $1 million or less were allowed to compete in Feature competition. The winners shared more than $200,000 in cash and prizes, and one winner won guaranteed production of a feature film.

Films

Films that premiered at the festival included Dear Zachary: A Letter to a Son About His Father, a documentary about the murder of Zachary Turner.

References

External links
Slamdance Film Festival 2008 Films
Slamdance Film Festival 2008 Schedule

Slamdance Film Festival
Slamdance Film Festival, 2008
Slamdance Film Festival, 2008
Slamdance
2008 in American cinema